Robert Bracey Lynam (born 1944) is a retired professional basketball guard who played one season in the American Basketball Association (ABA) as a member of the Denver Rockets during the 1967–68 season. He attended Oklahoma Baptist University where he was selected by the Cincinnati Royals in the 11 round of the 1966 NBA Draft. He never signed with the Royals.

External links

1944 births
Living people
American men's basketball players
Basketball players from Oklahoma
Cincinnati Royals draft picks
Denver Rockets players
Guards (basketball)
Oklahoma Baptist Bison basketball players